This article shows a list of flags of the German Wehrmacht and Heer which were used in the years between 1933 and 1945 by the German Reichswehr, Wehrmacht and Heer.

Supreme command flags of the Reichswehr and Wehrmacht

Supreme command flags of occupied territories

Supreme command flags of the Heer

See also
 List of flags of the Luftwaffe (1933–1945)
 List of flags of the German Navy (1935–1945)
 List of German standards at the Moscow Victory Parade of 1945

Literatur

External links 
 Flags of the world (Flags of the Armed Forces 1933–1945)

Flags
Wehrmacht
Wehrmacht flags
Wehrmacht